John Solomon Hendrix House, also known as the Sol Hendrix House, is a historic home located near Lexington, Lexington County, South Carolina. It was built about 1850, and is a two-story, rectangular, weatherboarded frame farmhouse.  It has a gable roof and exterior end chimneys. The front façade features a double tiered porch supported by square wood posts.

It was listed on the National Register of Historic Places in 1983.

References 

Houses on the National Register of Historic Places in South Carolina
Queen Anne architecture in South Carolina
Houses completed in 1850
Houses in Lexington County, South Carolina
National Register of Historic Places in Lexington County, South Carolina